Tomás Roberto Silverio Veloz (October 14, 1945April 2, 2011) was a Dominican professional baseball player who had a 17-year career in organized baseball. The outfielder and native of Santiago de los Caballeros appeared in 31 games played over parts of three Major League Baseball seasons for the California Angels from 1970 to 1972.

Silvero entered professional baseball in the Angels' system in 1965 and batted over .300 twice in the Triple-A Pacific Coast League. However, he scuffled at the plate during his three trials with the Angels, collecting only three hits (all off them singles) in 30 at bats, with two bases on balls and four strikeouts. He appeared in ten games in the outfield, but started only one (on April 19, 1972, against the Minnesota Twins at Anaheim Stadium). After eight years in the Angels' organization, Silverio played another nine seasons in the Triple-A Mexican League, retiring after the 1981 campaign.

His son, Nelson, was a coach in the New York Mets' farm system in 2004.

References

External links

1945 births
2011 deaths
Águilas Cibaeñas players
Alijadores de Tampico players
California Angels players
Diablos Blancos de Unión Laguna players
Dominican Republic expatriate baseball players in the United States

Dorados de Chihuahua players
El Paso Sun Kings players
Hawaii Islanders players
Idaho Falls Angels players
Major League Baseball outfielders
Major League Baseball players from the Dominican Republic
People from Santiago de los Caballeros
Quad Cities Angels players
Salt Lake City Angels players
San Jose Bees players
Saraperos de Saltillo players
Tigres del México players
Dominican Republic expatriate baseball players in Mexico